Ruslan Viacheslavovich Bernikov (born December 4, 1977) is a Russian former professional ice hockey right winger.

Career
Bernikov began his career with Dynamo Moscow in the Russian Superleague during the 1996–97 season, playing two games. He then spent a season with Dinamo-Energija Yekaterinburg before splitting the 1998–99 season with four different teams, playing one game for CSKA Moscow, six for Dynamo Moscow, twenty for Krylya Sovetov Moscow and five Severstal Cherepovets. The following season, he had another short spell with Dynamo, playing six games, before suiting up for Amur Khabarovsk for fourteen games. Bernikov was selected in the 5th round (139th overall) of the 2000 NHL Entry Draft by the Dallas Stars though he remained in Russia and never played in North America.

He would spend the next two seasons with Amur Khabarovsk before returning to Krylya Sovetov in 2002 for one season. In 2003, Bernikov joined Lada Togliatti. He then returned ro Severstal Cherepovets midway through the 2004–05 season before spending the following season with three different teams, Ak Bars Kazan, Khimik Moscow Oblast and Salavat Yulaev Ufa.

For the 2007–08 season, Bernikov joined Sibir Novosibirsk, but left mid-season and Neftekhimik Nizhnekamsk. It turned out to be the final season of the Superleague as it would be replaced by the Kontinental Hockey League. He would split the inaugural KHL season with Neftekhimik Nizhnekamsk and Vityaz. After a brief return with Amur Khabarovsk the following year where he played nine games, Bernikov played six games for Torpedo Nizhny Novgorod during the 2010–11 season, his 14th and last top-tier Russian team.

After spending the next three seasons in the second-tier Supreme Hockey League for Kazzinc-Torpedo and Buran Voronezh, Bernikov finished his career playing four seasons in Asia League Ice Hockey, three season with the Russian-based Sakhalin and one final season with the South Korean team Anyang Halla before retiring in 2018.

Career statistics

External links

1977 births
Ak Bars Kazan players
Amur Khabarovsk players
HL Anyang players
Atlant Moscow Oblast players
Buran Voronezh players
Dallas Stars draft picks
HC CSKA Moscow players
HC Dynamo Moscow players
Kazzinc-Torpedo players
HC Lada Togliatti players
HC Neftekhimik Nizhnekamsk players
Severstal Cherepovets players
Krylya Sovetov Moscow players
Living people
Russian ice hockey right wingers
PSK Sakhalin players 
Salavat Yulaev Ufa players
HC Sibir Novosibirsk players
Torpedo Nizhny Novgorod players
HC Vityaz players